Abū ʿUthman ʿAmr ibn Baḥr al-Kinānī al-Baṣrī, commonly known as al-Jāḥiẓ (The Bug Eyed, born 776 – died December 868/January 869) was a prose writer and author of works of literature, theology, zoology, and politico-religious polemics. He described himself as a member of the Arabian tribe Banu Kinanah.

A thousand years before Darwin, Al-Jahiz came to the conclusion that there must be some mechanisms that influence the evolution of animals. He writes about three main mechanisms; the struggle for existence, the transformation of species into each other, and the environmental factors. He is therefore credited with outlining the principles of natural selection.

Ibn al-Nadim lists nearly 140 titles attributed to Al-Jahiz, of which 75 are extant. The best known are Kitāb al-Ḥayawān (The book of Animals), a seven-part compendium on an array of subjects with animals as their point of departure; Kitāb al-Bayān wa-l-tabyīn (The book of eloquence and exposition), a wide-ranging work on human communication; and Kitāb al-Bukhalāʾ (The book of misers), a collection of anecdotes on stinginess. Tradition claims that he was smothered to death when a vast amount of books fell over him.

Life
He was Abū ʿUthman ʿAmr ibn Bahr ibn Maḥbūb, a protégé of Abū al-Qallamas ‘Amr ibn Qal‘ al-Kinānī, then al-Fuqaymī, a.k.a. ‘Amr ibn Qal‘ al-Kinānī al-Fuqaymī  whose   ancestor was one of the Nasah (Nasa’ah).  The grandfather of al-Jāḥiẓ was a Black jammāl (cameleer)  or ḥammāl (porter); the manuscripts differ.of ‘Amr ibn Qal‘ named Maḥbūb, nicknamed Fazārah, or Fazārah was his maternal grandfather, and Maḥbūb his paternal. The names may however have been confused. Al-Jāḥiẓ died 250 [A.D. 869], during the caliphate of al-Mu‘tazz.  Al-Nadīm reports that al-Jāḥiẓ said he was about the same age as Abū Nuwās and older than al-Jammāz. 
Not much is known about al-Jāḥiẓ's early life, but his family was very poor. Born in Basra early in 160/February 776, he asserted in a book he wrote that he was a member of the Arabian tribe Banu Kinanah. His nephew also reported that al-Jāḥiẓ's grandfather was a black cameleer.

He sold fish along one of the canals in Basra to help his family. Financial difficulties, however, did not stop al-Jāḥiẓ from continuously seeking knowledge. He used to gather with a group of other youths at Basra's main mosque, where they would discuss different scientific subjects.  During the cultural and intellectual revolution under the Abbasid Caliphate books became readily available, and learning accessible. Al-Jāḥiẓ  studied philology, lexicography and poetry from among the most learned scholars at the School of Basra, where he attended the lectures of Abū Ubaydah, Al-Aṣma’ī, Sa'īd ibn Aws al-Anṣārī and studied ilm an-naḥw (i.e., syntax) with Akhfash al-Awsaṭ (al-Akhfash Abī al-Ḥasan).
Over a twenty-five-year span studying,  al-Jāḥiẓ acquired a considerable knowledge of Arabic poetry, Arabic philology, pre-Islamic Arab history, the Qur'an and the Hadiths.  He read translated books on Greek sciences and Hellenistic philosophy, especially that of the Greek philosopher Aristotle. Al-Jahiz was also critical of those who followed the Hadiths of Abu Hurayra, referring to his Hadithist opponents as al-nabita ("the contemptible").

Career

While still in Basra, al-Jāḥiẓ wrote an article about the institution of the Caliphate. This is said to have been the beginning of his career as a writer, which would become his sole source of living. It is said that his mother once offered him a tray full of notebooks and told him he would earn his living from writing. He went on to write two hundred books in his lifetime on a variety of subjects, including on the Quran, Arabic grammar, zoology, poetry, lexicography, and rhetoric. Of his writings, only thirty books survive. Al-Jāḥiẓ was also one of the first Arabic writers to suggest a complete overhaul of the language's grammatical system, though this would not be undertaken until his fellow linguist Ibn Maḍāʾ took up the matter two hundred years later. 
          
Al-Nadīm cited this passage from a book of al-Jāḥiẓ:When I was writing these two books, about the creation of the Qur’ān, which was the tenet given importance and honour by the Commander of the Faithful, and another about superiority in connection with the Banū Hāshim, the ‘Abd Shams, and Makhzūm. What was my due but to sit above the Simakān, Spica and Arcturus, or on top of the ‘Ayyūq, or to deal with red sulphur, or to conduct the ‘Anqā by her leading string to the Greatest King. 

Al-Jāḥiẓ moved to Baghdad, then the capital of the Abbasid Caliphate, in 816 AD, because the caliphs encouraged scientists and scholars and had just founded the library of the Bayt al-Ḥikmah.  But al-Nadim suspected a claim by al-Jāḥiẓ that the caliph al-Ma’mūn had praised his books on the imamate and the caliphate, for his eloquent phraseology, and use of market-place speech, and that of the elite and of the kings, was exaggerated self-glorification and doubted that al-Ma’mūn could have spoken these words. Al-Jāḥiẓ was said to have admired the eloquent literary style of the director of the library, Sahl ibn Hārūn (d. 859/860) and quoted his works. Because of the caliphs' patronage and his eagerness to establish himself and reach a wider audience, al-Jāḥiẓ stayed in Baghdad.

Al-Nadīm gives two versions of an anecdote which differ in their source: his first source is Abū Hiffān and his second is the grammarian al-Mubarrad, and retells the story of al-Jāḥiẓ's reputation for being one of the three great bibliophiles and scholarsthe two others being al-Fatḥ ibn Khāqān and judge Ismā’īl ibn Isḥāq such that “whenever a book came into the hand of al-Jāḥiẓ he read through it, wherever he happened to be. He even used to rent the shops of al-warrāqūn for study.”

Al-Jāḥiẓ replaced Ibrāhīm ibn al-‘Abbās al-Ṣūlī in the government secretariat of al-Ma’mūn but left after just three days.  Later at Samarra he wrote a huge number of his books. The caliph al-Ma'mun wanted al-Jāḥiẓ to teach his children, but then changed his mind when his children were frightened by al-Jāḥiẓ's boggle-eyes. This is said to be the origin of his nickname. He enjoyed the patronage of al-Fath ibn Khaqan, the bibliophile boon companion of Caliph al-Mutawakkil, but after his murder in December 861 he left Samarra for his native Basra, where he lived on his estate with his “concubine, her maid, a manservant, and a donkey.”  He died there in late 868, according to one story, when a pile of books from his private library collapsed on him.

Most important books

Kitāb al-Ḥayawān 'book of the animals'
Kitāb al-Ḥayawān is an encyclopedia in seven volumes of anecdotes, poetic descriptions and proverbs describing over 350 species of animals.  Composed in honour of Muḥammad ibn ‘Abd al-Mālik al-Zayyāt, who paid him five thousand gold coins (5., dīnār).  The 11th-century scholar Al-Khatib al-Baghdadi dismissed it as  "little more than a plagiarism" of Aristotle's Kitāb al-Hayawāna charge of plagiarism was levelled against Aristotle himself with regard to a certain "Asclepiades of Pergamum". Later scholars have noted that there was only a limited Aristotelian influence in al-Jāḥiẓ's work, and that al-Baghdadi may have been unacquainted with Aristotle's work.

"Environmental factors influence organisms to develop new characteristics to ensure survival, thus transforming them into new species. Animals that survive to breed can pass on their successful characteristics to their offspring."

Conway Zirkle, writing about the history of natural selection science in 1941, said that an excerpt from this work was the only relevant passage he had found from an Arabian scholar. He provided a quotation describing the struggle for existence, citing a Spanish translation of this work:

The rat goes out for its food, and is clever in getting it, for it eats all animals inferior to it in strength", and in turn, it "has to avoid snakes and birds and serpents of prey, who look for it in order to devour it" and are stronger than the rat. Mosquitos "know instinctively that blood is the thing which makes them live" and when they see an animal, "they know that the skin has been fashioned to serve them as food". In turn, flies hunt the mosquito "which is the food that they like best", and predators eat the flies. "All animals, in short, can not exist without food, neither can the hunting animal escape being hunted in his turn. Every weak animal devours those weaker than itself. Strong animals cannot escape being devoured by other animals stronger than they. And in this respect, men do not differ from animals, some with respect to others, although they do not arrive at the same extremes. In short, God has disposed some human beings as a cause of life for others, and likewise, he has disposed the latter as a cause of the death of the former."

Al-Jahiz recognized eco-systems, and like Aristotle, believed in spontaneous generation. He frequently used metaphors of webs and nets to express interconnectedness in the book.

Kitāb al-Bukhalā’ 'the book of misers' (a.k.a. 'avarice and the avaricious')
A collection of stories about the greedy. Humorous and satirical, it is the best example of al-Jāḥiẓ' prose style. Al-Jāḥiẓ ridicules schoolmasters, beggars, singers and scribes for their greedy behavior. Many of the stories continue to be reprinted in magazines throughout the Arabic-speaking world. The book is considered one of the best works of al-Jāḥiẓ. The book has two English translations: One by Robert Bertram Serjeant titled The Book of Misers, and another by Jim Colville titled Avarice and the Avaricious.  Editions: Arabic (Al-Ḥājirī, Cairo, 1958);  Arabic text, French preface. Le Livre des avares. (Pellat. Paris, 1951)

Kitāb al-Bayān wa-al-Tabyīn 'The Book of eloquence and demonstration' 
al-Bayan wa al-Tabyin was one of al-Jāḥiẓ's later works, in which he wrote on epiphanies, rhetorical speeches, sectarian leaders, and princes. Though he was neither a poet nor a philologist in the proper sense – al-Jāḥiẓ took a keen interest in almost any imaginable subject – the book is considered to have started Arabic literary theory in a formal, systemic fashion. Al-Jāḥiẓ's defining of eloquence as the ability of the speaker to deliver an effective message while maintaining it as brief or elaborate at will was widely accepted by later Arabic literary critics.

Fakhr Al-Sūdān Ala Al-Bīḍān 'pride of blacks over whites' 
This book is composed as an imaginary debate between black people and white people as to which group is superior. Al-Jāḥiẓ mentions that Blacks have an oratory and eloquence of their own culture and language.

On the Zanj ("Swahili coast")
Concerning the Zanj, he wrote:

Mu‘tazilī theological debate
Al-Jāḥiẓ intervened in a theological dispute between two Mu’tazilītes, and defended Abū al-Hudhayl against the criticism of Bishr ibn al-Mu‘tamir.  Another Mu‘tazilite theologian, Ja‘far ibn Mubashshir, wrote a  “refutation of al-Jāḥiẓ”.

According to the Encyclopædia Britannica, he was "part of the rationalist Mu’tazilite school of theology supported by the caliph al-Maʾmūn and his successor. When Muʿtazilism was abandoned by the caliph al-Mutawakkil, al-Jāḥiẓ remained in favour by writing essays such as Manāqib at-turk (Eng. trans., “Exploits of the Turks”).

Death
Al-Jāḥiẓ returned to Basra with hemiplegia after spending more than fifty years in Baghdad. He died in Basra in the Arabic month of Muharram in AH 255/December 868 – January 869 AD. His exact cause of death is not clear, but a popular assumption is that al-Jāḥiẓ died in his private library after one of many large piles of books fell on him, killing him instantly.

See also 
Shu'ubiyya
Ajam
Al-Jāhiz (crater)
List of Arab scientists and scholars

References

Notes

Citations

Sources

 Montgomery, James (2013). Al-Jāḥiẓ: In Praise of Books. Edinburgh: Edinburgh University Press. .

*

External links

Kitāb al-Hayawān (Book of Animals), by Al-Jāḥiẓ (Full Arabic text)
Arabic literature

Darwinism
776 births
860s deaths
8th-century Arabs
9th-century Arabs
Mu'tazilites
9th-century Muslim scholars of Islam
Arab writers
Medieval Arabic literature
9th-century Arabic writers
People from Basra
 
Zoologists of the medieval Islamic world
9th-century people from the Abbasid Caliphate
Scholars from the Abbasid Caliphate